This is a List of Permanent Representatives of Ecuador to the Organization of American States.

-: Gonzalo Escudero
-: 
-: Francisco Proaño
-: María Isabel Salvador
-: Marco Vinicio Albuja Martínez
:José Valencia Amores
-: Carlos Alberto Jativa Naranjo

References

 
Ecuador
Organization of American States